Serian is a district, in Serian Division, Sarawak, Malaysia.

References